Viișoara is a commune in Botoșani County, Western Moldavia, Romania. It is composed of three villages: Cuza Vodă, Viișoara and Viișoara Mică.

Natives
 Dimitrie Brândză

References

Communes in Botoșani County
Localities in Western Moldavia